Rosenanee Kanoh (also Rosenan Kanoh) (Thai:โรสนานี กาโน๊ะ, born 13 May 1999) is a Thai cricketer. In July 2018, she was named in Thailand's squad for the 2018 ICC Women's World Twenty20 Qualifier tournament. In August 2019, she was named in Thailand's squad for the 2019 ICC Women's World Twenty20 Qualifier tournament in Scotland. She made her Women's Twenty20 International (WT20I) debut for Thailand, against Bangladesh, in the Netherlands on 21 August 2019.

In January 2020, she was named in Thailand's squad for the 2020 ICC Women's T20 World Cup in Australia. In November 2021, she was named in Thailand's team for the 2021 Women's Cricket World Cup Qualifier tournament in Zimbabwe. She played in Thailand's first match of the tournament, on 21 November 2021 against Zimbabwe.

In October 2022, she played for Thailand in Women's Twenty20 Asia Cup.

Apart from cricket, Kanoh is also a student at the Thammasat University.

References

External links
 

1999 births
Living people
Rosenanee Kanoh
Rosenanee Kanoh
Rosenanee Kanoh
Rosenanee Kanoh
Southeast Asian Games medalists in cricket
Southeast Asian Games bronze medalists for Malaysia
Competitors at the 2017 Southeast Asian Games
Rosenanee Kanoh
Rosenanee Kanoh